David Samuel Cohen (born June 11, 1963) is an American attorney who serves as the deputy director of the Central Intelligence Agency (CIA) since January 20, 2021. He also served as acting Director of the Central Intelligence Agency from January to March 2021. He previously occupied the role of deputy director from February 9, 2015 to January 20, 2017. Originally from Boston, Cohen previously worked at the U.S. Treasury Department and as an attorney in private practice. At the Treasury, among other posts, he served as the under secretary for terrorism and financial intelligence where he gained the nickname of "sanctions guru".

Early life and education
Cohen was born on June 11, 1963, the son of a Jewish doctor family from Boston. He graduated from Cornell University in 1985 with a bachelor's in government and went on to receive a Juris Doctor from Yale Law School in 1989. After graduating from law school, Cohen served as a law clerk for federal judge Norman P. Ramsey for the U.S. District Court for the District of Maryland.

Career

Following his clerkship, Cohen began his law career at the firm Miller, Cassidy, Larroca & Lewin, a “criminal-defense boutique” in Washington, D.C. He specialized in white-collar
criminal defense and civil litigation. He was hired by the U.S. Treasury Department in 1999 as an aide to General Counsel Neal S. Wolin and then as Acting Deputy General Counsel. While there he was credited by department officials with "crafting legislation that formed the basis" of Title III of the USA PATRIOT Act, dealing with money laundering. In 2001 he left the government and joined the Washington law firm Wilmer Cutler Pickering Hale and Dorr, now known as WilmerHale. He practiced there for seven years, becoming partner in 2004. His practice areas included complex civil litigation, white-collar criminal defense, internal investigations, and anti-money laundering and sanctions compliance.

In 2009, President Barack Obama nominated Cohen to be Assistant Secretary for Terrorist Financing in the Treasury Department, and the U.S. Senate confirmed him on May 1, 2009. Variously described by members of the Obama administration as a "financial Batman" and one of the president's "favorite combatant commanders", he was, two years later, nominated and confirmed as Under Secretary of the Treasury for Terrorism and Financial Intelligence. In that role, he "preside[d] over a 700-person, $200 million-a-year counterterrorism office within Treasury that was created after the September 11, 2001, attacks" and includes the Office of Foreign Assets Control, which implements U.S. economic sanctions. During his Senate confirmation hearing, Cohen singled-out the government of Kuwait for rebuke, noting that "we have a real challenge with the Kuwaiti government. Kuwait is the only government in the Gulf Cooperation Council that does not criminalize terrorist financing." The following year, Cohen appeared as speaker at the annual forum of the Foundation for Defense of Democracies.

In 2015, Cohen was appointed Deputy Director of the Central Intelligence Agency. At the time of his appointment, some speculated that Cohen's selection was due to the Obama administration's reluctance in picking someone with ties to past incidences of CIA torture and extraordinary rendition. The post of deputy director has traditionally been filled by military officers or intelligence community veterans.

Personal life
Cohen is married with two children. He met his wife while in law school. In May 2019, Cohen had a cameo role in Season 8, Episode 2 of Game of Thrones.

References

External links

1963 births
Cornell University alumni
Deputy Directors of the Central Intelligence Agency
Jewish American attorneys
Living people
United States Assistant Secretaries of the Treasury
Wilmer Cutler Pickering Hale and Dorr partners
Yale Law School alumni
21st-century American Jews